Hesburger (colloquially known in Finland as Hese and in Estonia as Hess) is a fast food chain based in Turku, Finland. Today, it is the largest hamburger restaurant chain in Finland, Estonia, Latvia and Lithuania with a market share larger than that of U.S.-based rival McDonald's. It further operates in Ukraine, Germany and Bulgaria. Hesburger primarily purveys fast foods such as hamburgers, fries, salads and desserts. The company name is derived from the nickname of the founder, Heikki "Hese" Salmela. The company also operates Hesecafes, which sell pastries and specialty coffees, as well as hot dog outlets. Some restaurants provide car wash services.

History 

The chain's history reaches back to 1966, when 20-year old Heikki Salmela opened a street food kiosk in Naantali. He later opened the first Hesburger in 1980 on Kristiinankatu in Turku, which became the first element of the first fast food restaurant chain in Finland. In the 1980s the chain grew fast. Salmela sold the chain and several hotels in 1988 for almost 200 million Finnish markka. Three years later, during the early 1990s recession, he bought it back for 25 million markka.

With only 12 outlets in 1992, Hesburger expanded to over 200 restaurants in 60 cities and towns across Finland over the following decade, absorbing rival chain Carrols in 2002. The purchase of Carrols gave Hesburger some previously nonexistent leverage on the fast food market of Helsinki. Hesburger has kept rival chain McDonald's out of Turku efficiently: in 2014, there were 21 Hesburgers but only two McDonald's-locations in the city. Hesburger has also expanded to international markets, opening outlets in the Baltic states and Germany. There was a Hesburger in Damascus, Syria for a short period between 2004 and 2006, but it was closed as unprofitable. Further expansion into the Middle East has been discussed by the company.

Russia 

The first attempts to enter the Russian market were made at the end of the 80's. In the summer of 1988 through the «joint Soviet-Finnish enterprise» in St. Petersburg, and later in the Vyborge and Petrozavodsk were opened Street tents under the Liha Polar brand, they were made in the Hesburger color scheme. In the menu was hamburgers, cheeseburgers, fries and other dishes are typical for Hesburger. In the late 1990s/early 2000s restaurants ceased to exist for unknown reasons.

The first Russian Hesburger opened in January 2010 in Moscow, and a year later in St. Petersburg. The network worked on the rights of master franchise LLC Rusburger, owned by the meat-industrial company Ostankino. By the end of 2012, Hesburger still opened 13 restaurants, as well as with the help of partners launched restaurants in Ufa, Krasnoyarsk and in the far East.

In December 2013, Hesburger changed the owner, it became a group of companies "Megagrupp".

On March 29, 2022, Hesburger announced a slow departure from the Russian and Belarusian markets. 40 restaurants are available in Russia.

In may, a local brand SuperBurger was registered, the new restaurant logo resembles the traditional Hesburger logo. In the future, it will replace Hesburger.

As of late November 2022, Hesburger restaurants continue to work.

Restaurants 

Hesburger employs over 8,000 people, of whom 5,400 are based in Finland.
Hesburger has been actively expanding its operations in Lithuania, announcing investments of 3,5 million euros in 2016, around 4 million in 2017 and 4 million in 2018.

Operations
 Hesburger hamburger restaurants
 Hesecafe – hamburgers, coffee drinks and pastries
 HeseHotelli – hotels with Hesburger restaurant also acting as the hotel reception
 Hese kotituotteet – retail products
 Hese Nakkari – snack kiosk products
 Heseautopesu – car wash services for Hesburger customers

See also 
 List of hamburger restaurants

References

External links 
 
 

Fast-food chains of Finland
Fast-food hamburger restaurants
Fast-food franchises
Regional restaurant chains
Restaurants established in 1966
Finnish companies established in 1966